Raphine is an unincorporated community in Rockbridge County in the Shenandoah Valley in the U.S. state of Virginia.

History
The name "Raphine" was chosen in honor of James Edward Allen Gibbs (1829-1902), a local farmer who patented a novel single-thread chain-stitch sewing machine on June 2, 1857. Gibbs had named his home in the area ("Raphine Hall"), as well as the new railroad station ("Raphine"), after the ancient Greek "rhaphis", meaning "needle.".  In partnership with James Willcox, Gibbs formed the Willcox & Gibbs Sewing Machine Company. Willcox & Gibbs commercial sewing machines are still made and used in the 21st century.

Nearby, the McCormick family farm, Walnut Grove, was the home of Cyrus McCormick (1809-1884).  He became famous as the inventor of the mechanical reaper in 1831. He moved to Chicago, Illinois in 1847, and was the founder, with his brother Leander, of the McCormick Harvesting Machine Company which became part of International Harvester Corporation in 1902. The McCormick farm  became a test farm for Virginia Polytechnic Institute and State University (better known as "Virginia Tech").

In addition to Walnut Grove, the Kennedy-Lunsford Farm and Kennedy-Wade Mill are listed on the National Register of Historic Places.

Publications 
 The Rockbridge Advocate (monthly magazine)
 The News-Gazette (weekly newspaper)
 Rockbridge Weekly (weekly newspaper)

References

Unincorporated communities in Rockbridge County, Virginia
Unincorporated communities in Virginia